Robert Calhoun (1931 - May 24, 2008) was an Emmy Award winning producer.

Personal life 
Calhoun was born in Brooklyn, New York in 1931. He attended University of Maryland and later served in the United States Navy. He met his lifelong partner, Farley Granger (1925-2011) while serving as the production supervisor for The Seagull in 1963.
Calhoun died of lung cancer on May 24, 2008.

References 

1931 births
2008 deaths
American television producers
United States Navy sailors
LGBT people from New York (state)